Poundstretcher (previously styled as £-stretcher  and also previously known as  ...instore) is a chain of discount stores operating in the United Kingdom. It is based in Kirby Muxloe, England.

History
Poundstretcher was established in 1981 by Paul Appell and Stephen Fearnley.  It became a subsidiary of Brown & Jackson plc, originally a construction firm which can be traced back to 1923, in March 1989.

In 1995 Pepkor, South Africa’s largest retailer, acquired a controlling stake in Brown & Jackson plc and refinanced it.  Brown & Jackson expanded rapidly with What Everyone Wants and Your More Stores purchased in October 1997 and The Brunswick Warehouse in January 2000.  During 2000 the group continued to expand organically, including its first overseas venture with the opening of 6 stores in Poland.

During 2002 the group embarked on a major restructuring. The board undertook to dispose of the trading subsidiaries other than Poundstretcher Ltd and this disposal was completed on 27 September 2002.  In 2003 the company undertook a rebrand of company name to Instore plc. Poundstretcher stores were gradually being rebranded to ...instore, however in 2006, a new chief executive concluded that the rebranding was not working, and from June 2009, new stores were opened as Poundstretcher after Instore plc was acquired by the Crown Crest Group. In September 2012, the group had 400 stores in the United Kingdom.

In May 2011, the company bought Alworths. On 6 February 2012, Poundstretcher acquired 20 stores from the UGO chain, after it was placed in administration. In September 2012, it was announced that out of the 20 stores that were acquired, 14 were to close, and the remaining 6 most profitable outlets would remain as part of the group.

In 2018, after Poundworld was shut down, Poundstretcher began to open former stores under the Bargain Buys brand name, which was previously used by the former company. The trademark for Bargain Buys was claimed by Poundstretcher.

In-house Brands 

 BeautySave
 Life From Coloroll
 The Pet Hut
 TeliToy

Ownership
After selling Poundstretcher to Philip Harris, Mr. Appell & Mr. Fearnley acquired control of a failing retail business, United News Shops, which they managed to revitalise. It is now the largest convenience store and cafeteria business servicing British hospitals. In March 2008, United News Shops was sold to WHSmith.

The Poundstretcher Group is now owned by Crown Crest Group, which is run by brothers Rashid & Aziz Tayub.

Outside United Kingdom
In April 2012, Poundstretcher opened its first store outside United Kingdom, at Madina Mall, Dubai, UAE.

Saving Poundstretcher
In August 2018, Channel 4 broadcast Saving Poundstretcher which focused on former Poundworld owner Chris Edwards's attempts to revitalise the chain.

See also
Poundland

References

External links
 Poundstretcher website

1981 establishments in the United Kingdom
Retail companies established in 1981
Companies based in Huddersfield
Discount shops of the United Kingdom
Retail companies of the United Kingdom
Variety stores